The Colorado Buffaloes women's basketball team represents the University of Colorado Boulder and competes in the Pac-12 Conference of NCAA Division I.

Conferences
Colorado currently plays in the Pac-12 Conference. Prior to the 2011/12 season, they played in the Big 12 Conference. The Buffaloes joined the Big 12 in 1997 when the Big 12 was formed, following the merger of the Big Eight Conference with several former members of the Southwest Conference.

Coaches
Colorado's head women's basketball coach is JR Payne. Payne was hired prior to the 2016–17 season. She replaced Linda Lappe, who was fired at the end of the 2015–16 season with a 7–23 record.

On March 28, 2016, JR Payne became head coach at Colorado. The eighth head coach in program history, Payne replaced Linda Lappe, who was fired after only managing only a career 33-57 (.367) record in Pac-12 play. JR Payne inherited a program that only finished 7-23 (2-16 Pac-12) in Lappe's final season.  JR Payne's 2018-19 Colorado team began Pac-12 conference play with 11 straight losses, the worst start to conference play in program history. JR Payne's 2018-19 Buffs lost on the road to #4/#4 ranked Oregon 102-43, the 59 point loss was the worst loss in 35 years, and 4th worst in program history.  The Buffs home win against USC on Feb 10, 2019 allowed CU to prevent from having both the first 12 game losing streak in program history, and the first winless conference season in program history.

Roster

Year by year results

Conference tournament winners noted with (W)
Source

|-style="background: #ffffdd;"
| colspan="8" align="center" | Big Eight Conference

|-style="background: #ffffdd;"
| colspan="8" align="center" | Big 12 Conference

|-style="background: #ffffdd;"
| colspan="8" align="center" | Pac-12 Conference

NCAA tournament results
The Buffaloes have appeared in 13 NCAA Tournaments, with a record of 17-13

References

External links